Dunboyne is a town in Meath, Ireland. It is a commuter town for Dublin. In the 20 years between the 1996 and 2016 censuses, the population of Dunboyne more than doubled from 3,080 to 7,272 inhabitants.

Location

Dunboyne is centred on the crossroads formed by the R156 regional road and the old Maynooth Road (formerly designated R157).

History

Dunboyne's Irish language name, Dún Búinne, indicates it was the fort of Bui who was the wife of the god Lugh. Dunboyne was home to many men who fought for and against British rule in the Irish Rebellion of 1798. During the War of Independence the town was Division Headquarters to the IRA (Irish Republican Army) 1st Eastern Division, a unit formed in April 1921 under Divisional commander, Seán Boylan. The Division consisted nine brigades: 1st Brigade (south Meath & north Kildare); 2nd (Navan & Trim); 3rd (Kells, Virginia & Mullagh); 4th, Delvin; 5th (Mullingar & north Westmeath); 6th, Edenderry; 7th (Naas & south Kildare); 8th Fingal; and 9th (Drogheda & south Louth). Dunboyne got its name from Boann, the goddess of the River Boyne. The River Tolka runs through Dunboyne.

Dunboyne Castle
Dunboyne Castle, originally a castle was built as a seat for a branch of the Butler dynasty, the Lords Dunboyne. It later passed to the Mangan family and was the seat of Simon Mangan, HM Lieutenant for County Meath in the 1890s and 1900s.

The house was sold in 1950 and became the Good Shepherd convent, in which nuns used to live and operate a mother and baby home, the Árd Mhuire mother and baby home in Dunboyne was opened by the sisters of the Good Shepherd in 1955. It closed in 1991. A partial section of the building has been dismantled. In 2006, the convent was sold and converted into a hotel.

Sport

Athletics
Dunboyne Athletic Club was founded in 1928 and is located on the Rooske Road, where facilities include a 400-metre, all-weather track, IAAF standard hammer throwing cage and club house. In 2013 the club had 790 registered members.

GAA
The local GAA team, St Peters Dunboyne GAA, won the Meath Senior Football Championship in 1998, 2005 and 2018. Dunboyne man Seán Boylan was the longest-serving county manager in GAA history and led Meath to four All Ireland victories in 1987, 1988, 1996 and 1999.

Since its foundation in 1996, Dunboyne Ladies GFC remains the only standalone Ladies Gaelic football club in Meath. Dunboyne Ladies GFC have won Meath Championships several times in all under age levels up to and including Under 21s.

Motor racing
Dunboyne was a motor racing venue between 1958 and 1967 for both cars and motorbikes. The racing circuit was a 4 mile long triangular shaped circuit with a combination of fast straights and hairpin bends. The start/finish line was in the centre of Dunboyne village and the racing circuit itself consisted of public roads around the village. During these years races such as the Leinster Trophy, Dunboyne Trophy and Holmpatrick Trophy were held.

Football
Dunboyne has two football clubs, Dunboyne FC and Dunboyne AFC. Dunboyne AFC's grounds are on the Summerhill Road which has a floodlit astro turf pitch, three 11 a-side pitches, two small-sided pitches, club shop, and clubhouse. Dunboyne FC plays in the Phoenix Park. They were both officially opened by Pele in November 2009 in recognition of the club receiving the FAI Club of the Year award for 2009.

Other sports
The GUI National Golf Academy is located 5 km outside Dunboyne on the Maynooth Road. It has a driving range, putting green and short game area. There is also a golf society in Dunboyne.

Two Irish rugby internationals, brothers Tom and Conleth Feighery who received a number of international caps in the 1970s, were born locally.

Education

Primary schools
Primary schools serving the area include Dunboyne Junior Primary School, Dunboyne Senior Primary School, Gaelscoil Thulach na nÓg and St Peter's National School (Church of Ireland).

In 2002 the headmaster at Gaelscoil Thulach na nÓg was dismissed by the board of patrons for writing a letter to the parents of the children which was deemed by the Board of Management to be misconduct. The parents of the school were divided on the issue, with some reportedly believing that the incident was unfairly represented in the press.

Post-primary
The local secondary school is St. Peter's College.

Dunboyne College of Further Education, located in Dunboyne Business Park, provides full-time courses at FETAC level 5. It is for PLC. The college operates under the authority of the County Meath Vocational Education Committee. As of 2016, 38 post-leaving certificate courses were offered by the college.

Youth clubs
Local youth club Cumann na bhFiann was begun in 2001, originating from the organisation Coláiste na bhFiann. The aim of the club is to promote the Irish language. Approximately 50 students participate in the club, which takes place from September to May. Foróige, an English speaking youth club, meets on Friday nights.

Dunboyne Community Centre
In 1985 a public meeting was held in Dunboyne, and it was agreed that a social and recreational centre was needed. Four years of fund-raising followed, and over £400,000 was raised. The Irish government contributed grants totalling £35,000, and a community centre was opened by then-President of Ireland, Dr Patrick Hillery, in 1989.

With the establishment of St Peter's College on the adjoining site in 1994, the opportunity arose to undertake a venture which subsequently became a model for school/community ventures elsewhere in Ireland. The money that would have been spent on putting sports facilities into the college, £280,000, was instead invested in the centre. Through further fund-raising, the committee added another £150,000 to this and the result was a major extension of the building in 1997. This arrangement provided the college with a larger sports hall than it otherwise would have had while, outside of school hours, the extension enabled the centre to cater to the growing community better. Health and fitness facilities were added in early 2000, and a floodlit all-weather pitch (another joint venture with St Peter's College), whose development began in 2003.

Transport

Road
Dunboyne is situated primarily on the Station Road (L2228) Regional Road, at the intersection of the Maynooth Road (L2227) The town also lies parallel with the M3 motorway, which connects to L2228 using the R157 at a roundabout west of the town.

Rail
There are two rail stations in Dunboyne. Dunboyne railway station, which was built to service the town and is situated to the east of the town and M3 Parkway railway station which was built to service commuters using the M3 coming down from Navan. They were built as part of the reopening of the Navan-Clonsilla line under the Irish Governments Transport 21 development programme. However, due to a lack of funding, this railway stops after the M3 Parkway railway station just outside of Dunboyne. The original Dunboyne railway station was opened on 29 August 1862 and closed on 1 April 1963.

Bus
Dunboyne is served by three bus routes: the 70 and 70d (operated by Dublin Bus) and 270 (operated by Go-Ahead Ireland). There is also a limited Bus Éireann service to/from Dunshaughlin, Navan and Kells on route 109 and to Mullingar, Killucan, Rathmolyon and Summerhill on route 118.

Bus Éireann route 109 provides two journeys a day in the morning to Kells via Dunshaughlin and Navan and two return journeys in the evening. No Bus Éireann services serve Dunboyne on Sundays. Bus Éireann route 111 between Dublin and Athboy stops at the M3 parkway station, just outside Dunboyne.

Geography
The Castle River flows into the Tolka river and flooding in and around Dunboyne has been attributed to problems further down the Tolka. Alleviation works have resulted in the risk of flooding being lessened. The last major flood was in 2002, preceded by a flood in 2000.

On 11 May 2007, the town was hit by a small tornado in which slates were torn from roofs and branches from trees during a brief storm.

In media
The 1970s television series, The Riordans, set in the fictional townland of Leestown, was filmed in Dunboyne.

People
 Thomas Blood (1618–1680), an Irish colonel best known for attempting to steal the Crown Jewels of England from the Tower of London in 1671.
Seán Boylan, former manager of the Meath GAA football team and the Irish International Rules team lives in Dunboyne.
John Bruton, former Taoiseach leader of Fine Gael, lives about 5 km outside the village. While envoy for the European Union to the United States, he resided mostly in Washington. He still maintains a home in Dunboyne.
 John Butler, 12th Baron Dunboyne
 Thomas Cusack, a Lord Chancellor of Ireland in the 1500s.
 Dermot Farrell, Bishop of Ossory, was formerly the parish priest to Dunboyne.
Virginia Kerr, Irish operatic soprano, is from Dunboyne and lives there.
Darragh Lenihan, association footballer who has played for Middlesbrough and Blackburn Rovers
Niall Quinn, a British Formula 3 driver and rookie driver for A1 Team Ireland was born in Dunboyne.
Brian Smyth, Meath's first All-Ireland Football winning captain in 1949, resided in Dunboyne.

See also
List of towns and villages in Ireland

References

External links

Dunboyne Parish

Towns and villages in County Meath